Ahmed Mahmoud Mashall (born 26 July 1948) is an Egyptian weightlifter. He competed in the men's bantamweight event at the 1976 Summer Olympics.

References

1948 births
Living people
Egyptian male weightlifters
Olympic weightlifters of Egypt
Weightlifters at the 1976 Summer Olympics
Place of birth missing (living people)